Equestrian perniosis is a skin condition that presents on the lateral thighs of equestrians who ride on cold damp days.

See also 
 Chilblains
 List of cutaneous conditions

References 

Skin conditions resulting from physical factors
Equestrianism